George Webber may refer to:
George Webber (athlete) (1895–?), British athlete
George Webber (cinematographer) (1876–1967), Canadian-born American cinematographer
George W. Webber (politician) (1825–1900), member of the U.S. House of Representatives from Michigan
George W. Webber (minister) (1920–2010), American Protestant minister and social activist
George Webber (poet) (1820–?), British poet
George William Wallace Webber, New Zealand postmaster, boarding-house keeper and farmer

See also
George Weber (disambiguation)
Georg Weber (disambiguation)